Elphinstone is a Scottish surname. It is locational from the lands of Elphinstone in the parish of Tranent.

Notable people with the surname include:

 Abi Elphinstone, British children's author
 Alexander Elphinstone, 1st Lord Elphinstone (died 1513), Scottish nobleman
 Alexander Elphinstone, 4th Lord Elphinstone (died 1638), Scottish nobleman
 Alexander Elphinstone, 19th Lord Elphinstone (born 1980), Scottish nobleman
 Arthur Elphinstone, 6th Lord Balmerino (1688–1746), Scottish nobleman and Jacobite army officer
 Augustus Elphinstone (1874–1964),  Australian businessman
 Cecil Elphinstone (1874–1964), Australian businessman and politician
 Charles Elphinstone Fleeming (1774–1840) (born Charles Elphinstone), British admiral
 David Elphinstone (1847–1916), Australian architect
 Derek Elphinstone (1913–1999), British actor
 Euphemia Elphinstone (fl.1509–1542), mistress of King James V of Scotland
 George Elphinstone (d. 1634), Provost of Glasgow
 George Elphinstone, 1st Viscount Keith (1746–1823), British admiral
 Hester Maria Elphinstone, Viscountess Keith (1764–1857), British literary correspondent and intellectual
 Howard Elphinstone (disambiguation), several people including
 Sir Howard Craufurd Elphinstone VC (1829–1890), British Army general
 James Elphinstone (disambiguation), several people
 John Elphinstone (1722–1785), British naval officer
 John Elphinstone, 17th Lord Elphinstone (1914–1975), British nobleman and army officer
 Sir Lancelot Henry Elphinstone (1879–1965), English lawyer, Attorney-General of Ceylon
 Margaret Elphinstone (born 1948), Scottish writer
 Mary Elphinstone, Lady Elphinstone (1883–1961), British noblewoman
 Mountstuart Elphinstone (1779–1859), Scottish statesman and historian, Lieutenant-Governor of Bombay in British India
 Robert Elphinstone, 3rd Lord Elphinstone (d. 1602), Scottish landowner
 Sidney Elphinstone, 16th Lord Elphinstone (1869–1955), Governor of the Bank of Scotland
 William Elphinstone (1431–1514), Scottish statesman, Bishop of Aberdeen and founder of the University of Aberdeen
 William George Keith Elphinstone (1782–1842), British general
 William Elphinstone, 15th Lord Elphinstone (1828–1893), Scottish politician

See also
 James Elphinston (1721–1809), Scottish educator, orthographer, phonologist and linguistics expert

References

Scottish toponymic surnames
Surnames of Lowland Scottish origin